Sky News has about 600 staff, of whom about 50 speak on camera.

Main news presenters

Main programme presenters

Other presenters

Editorial team & correspondents

Politics

International

National

Specialist

General news

Business and economics

Sport

Weather

The Pledge panellists
On 6 April 2016, Sky News announced that it was to launch a new show, entitled The Pledge. It will not have a traditional presenter, but will instead have 9 panellists, with 5 appearing on each episode. Michelle Dewberry, Nick Ferrari, Rachel Johnson, Graeme Le Saux and June Sarpong appeared in the first programme on Thursday 21 April.

The panel included:

Former presenters and reporters

 Dermot_Murnaghan Left 23 February 2023, after 16 years on Sky News. The last Tonight News with Dermot was broadcast on 28 February 2023. 
 Adam Boulton
 Lisa Aziz (now with LBC News)
 Faye Barker (now with ITN)
 Colin Brazier (now with GB News)
 Lukwesa Burak (now with BBC News)
 Ginny Buckley
 Stephanie Callister
 Liam Creagh
 David Chater
 Marverine Cole
 Stephen Cole (now with CGTN)
 Vivien Creegor
 Dharshini David
 Jason de la Pena
 Rona Dougall (now with STV)
 Stephen Dixon (now with GB News)
 Lorna Dunkley
 Julie Etchingham (now with ITV News)
 Gemma Evans
 Gamal Fahnbulleh (now with  Granada Reports)
 Juliette Foster (now with BBC World Service/BBC News)
 Bob Friend (deceased 2008)
 Steve Gaisford
 Steff Gaulter (now at Al Jazeera English)
 Charlotte Hawkins (now on Good Morning Britain on ITV)
 Steve Hargrave
 Eamonn Holmes ( Now GB News Weekday Breakfast )
 Alexandra Hill (now at ITN)
 Nicola Hill
 Faisal Islam (joined BBC News in 2019)
 Jannat Jalil (now with BBC News)
 Sangeeta Kandola (now at ITN)
 Phil Lavelle (now with CCTV America)
 Graeme Le Saux
 Mark Longhurst (now with GB News)
 Tim Marshall
 Emily Maitlis (now with Global)
 Darren McCaffery (now with GB News)
 Simon McCoy 
 Denise Nurse
 Glen Oglaza
 Kevin Owen (now with RT)
 Martin Popplewell
 Jeff Randall
 Samantha Simmonds (now with BBC World News)
 Peter Spencer (retired)
 Matt Smith
 Penny Smith
 Martin Stanford (now at LBC News)
 Jeremy Thompson (retired 2016)
 Claudia-Liza Vanderpuije (now with 5 News
 Hannah Vaughan Jones (now with CNN International)
 Lucy Verasamy (now with ITV Weather)
 Isabel Webster (now with GB News)
 Holly Williams (now at CBS News)
 Andrew Wilson
 Michael Wilson
 Francis Wilson
 Kate McCann (now with TalkTV)
 Michelle Clifford
 Enda Brady 
 Sarah Hewson (now with TalkTV)

References

Sky News
Television news in the United Kingdom
Lists of journalists